Christian Erb (born 14 February 1959) is a Swiss athlete. He competed in the men's discus throw at the 1992 Summer Olympics.

References

External links
 

1959 births
Living people
Athletes (track and field) at the 1992 Summer Olympics
Swiss male discus throwers
Olympic athletes of Switzerland
Place of birth missing (living people)